The chief statistician of Canada is the senior public servant responsible for Statistics Canada (StatCan), an agency of the Government of Canada. The office is equivalent to that of a deputy minister and as a member of the public service, the position is nonpartisan.

The chief statistician advises on matters pertaining to statistical programs of the department and agencies of the government, supervises the administration of the Statistics Act, controls the operation and staff of StatCan and reports annually on the activities of StatCan to the minister of industry.

The current chief statistician of Canada is Anil Arora, since September 19, 2016.

Dominion Statisticians and Chief Statisticians of Canada (1918 to present)

References and notes

External links
Statistics Canada web site
About Statistics Canada
Statistics Act

Innovation, Science and Economic Development Canada